The United States Court of Appeals for the Eighth Circuit (in case citations, 8th Cir.) is a United States federal court with appellate jurisdiction over the following United States district courts:
 Eastern District of Arkansas
 Western District of Arkansas
 Northern District of Iowa
 Southern District of Iowa
 District of Minnesota
 Eastern District of Missouri
 Western District of Missouri
 District of Nebraska
 District of North Dakota
 District of South Dakota

The court is composed of eleven active judges and is based primarily at the Thomas F. Eagleton United States Courthouse in St. Louis, Missouri, and secondarily at the Warren E. Burger United States Courthouse in St. Paul, Minnesota. It is one of thirteen United States courts of appeals. In 1929 Congress passed a statute dividing the Eighth Circuit that placed Minnesota, Iowa, North Dakota, South Dakota, Nebraska, Missouri, and Arkansas in the Eighth Circuit and created a Tenth Circuit that included Wyoming, Colorado, Utah, New Mexico, Kansas, and Oklahoma.

Composition

Current composition of the court
:

List of former judges

Chief judges

Succession of seats

See also
 Judicial appointment history for United States federal courts#Eighth Circuit
 List of current United States Circuit Judges

Notes

References

 primary but incomplete source for the duty stations

 secondary source for the duty stations
 data is current to 2002

 source for the state, lifetime, term of active judgeship, term of chief judgeship, term of senior judgeship, appointer, termination reason, and seat information

External links
United States Court of Appeals for the Eighth Circuit
Recent opinions from FindLaw

 
1891 establishments in the United States
Courts and tribunals established in 1891